D-13-ZC-TV (channel 13) is a television station in Virac, Catanduanes, Philippines, airing programming from the GMA network. Owned and operated by the network's namesake corporate parent, the station maintains transmitter facilities at Brgy. Sto. Niño, Virac, Catanduanes.

Although identifying as a separate station in its own right, D-13-ZC-TV is considered a straight simulcast of DWAI-TV (channel 7) in Naga City.

GMA TV-13 Catanduanes Programs
 Balitang Bicolandia - flagship afternoon newscast (simulcast on TV-7 Naga)
 Mornings with GMA Regional TV - flagship morning newscast (simulcast from GMA Dagupan)

See also
List of GMA Network stations

References

Television stations in Catanduanes
Television channels and stations established in 1999
GMA Network stations
1999 establishments in the Philippines